The St Luke Passion, BWV 246, is a Passion setting formerly attributed to Johann Sebastian Bach. It is included in the BWV catalog under the number 246. Now it appears in the catalogues under the heading apocryphal or anonymous.

History
A surviving manuscript of the St Luke Passion from about 1730 is partly in Bach's hand, though scholars believe that the music is certainly not his own. The music was later thought to have been composed by Johann Melchior Molter, but that was proven false because if Molter composed the music, then the manuscript would date to later than 1730. Presumably Bach performed it, or intended to perform it, in Leipzig. C. P. E. Bach and Agricola may have mistaken it for a work of Bach's and thus included it in their census. Of course, given his delight in exhaustive cycles, Bach should have composed a St Luke Passion. Apparently J. S. Bach took the anonymous St Luke Passion and arranged it for four voices, chorus, orchestra, and continuo to meet an urgent deadline for Good Friday in 1730.

Authenticity
With regard to the authorship of the passion, Felix Mendelssohn commented in a letter to Franz Hauser who had just paid a large sum of money to purchase the Lukaspassion: "I am sorry to hear you have given so much money for the St. Luke Passion." Mendelssohn repudiated Bach's authorship of the work upon the evidence of a single chorale, 'Weide mich und mach' mich satt' (No. 9). He continued: "No doubt, as an authentic autograph, it would be worth the price. But it is not by Bach. You ask, 'On what grounds do you maintain your opinion?' I answer, on intrinsic evidence, though it is unpleasant to say so, since it is your property. But just look at the chorale, 'Weide mich und mach' mich satt'! If that is by Sebastian, may I be hanged! It certainly is in his handwriting, but it is too clean. Evidently he copied it. 'Whose is it?' you ask; 'Telemann, or M. Bach, or Altnichol?' Jung Nichol or plain Nichol, how can I tell? It's not by Bach. Probably it is of North German origin." (Terry, 78).

In popular culture
Starting in 1999, an English performance of the aria "Lasst mich ihn nur noch einmal küssen" ('Just let me kiss him one more time') from the St. Luke Passion was used by musician Leyland James Kirby, also known as The Caretaker, as the track "Friends Past Reunited" on several of his albums. Specifically, he included the track on his first album, Selected Memories from the Haunted Ballroom (1999) and A Stairway to the Stars (2001). He also used the same performance recording as the ending to the final track of Stage 6, "Place in the World fades away", the finale to his final project, Everywhere at the End of Time (2016-2019). The exact performance remains unknown.

References

Further reading
 
 
 Erich Prieger: Echt oder unecht? Zur "Lucas-Passion", Berlin 1889
 Max Schneider: Zur Lukaspassion. Bach-Jahrbuch 1911, p. 105
 Manfred Langer: Franz Hauser und die Lukas-Passion BWV 246. Bach-Jahrbuch 1986, p. 131–134
 Daniel R. Melamed: Hat Johann Sebastian Bach die Lukas-Passion BWV 246 aufgeführt? Bach-Jahrbuch 2006, p. 161–169

External links
 Structure and Gospel texts
 
 

Passions and oratorios by Johann Sebastian Bach
1730 compositions
Bach: spurious and doubtful works
Music based on the Crucifixion of Jesus